C.O.D. is a 1932 British crime film directed by Michael Powell and starring Garry Marsh, Arthur Stratton and Sybil Grove. A man helps a woman to dispose of the body of her stepfather.

The film has been declared "Missing, Believed Lost" by the British Film Institute.

Cast
 Garry Marsh as Peter Craven
 Arthur Stratton as Mr Briggs
 Hope Davey as Frances
 Sybil Grove as Mrs Briggs
 Roland Culver as Edward
 Peter Gawthorne as Detective
 Cecil Ramage as Vyner
 Bruce Belfrage as Philip

References

Bibliography

 Chibnal, Steve. Quota Quickies : The Birth of the British 'B' Film. London: BFI, 2007. 
 Powell, Michael. A Life in Movies: An Autobiography. London: Heinemann, 1986. .

External links
 
 C.O.D. at the BFI SIFT database
 Contemporary reviews

1932 films
1930s English-language films
Films directed by Michael Powell
Films by Powell and Pressburger
1930s crime thriller films
British crime thriller films
Lost British films
British black-and-white films
1932 lost films
1930s British films